Tinker Federal Credit Union (TFCU) is a credit union headquartered in Tinker AFB, Oklahoma. Chartered and regulated under the authority of the National Credit Union Administration (NCUA) of the U.S. federal government. TFCU is the largest credit union in Oklahoma and serves Air Force personnel from Tinker Air Force Base, as well as the employees of more than 2,200 area companies, and residents of Oklahoma. As of March 2023, TFCU has $6 billion in assets, over 450,000 members and 32 full-service branches, as well as two TFCU Express Electronic Service Centers.

History
Tinker Federal Credit Union was founded on March 20, 1946, by a small group of civilian employees working at Tinker Field in Tinker Air Force Base. Since then, it has grown to become the largest credit union in Oklahoma.

Charitable activities
Tinker Federal is a large contributor to the Combined Federal Campaign, having donated over $1 million to the program. TFCU also hosts an annual Miracle Car Show as a benefit for the Children's Miracle Network and the Children's Medical Research Institute of Oklahoma City.

References

External links
 Official website
 Review Article

Credit unions based in Oklahoma
Companies based in Oklahoma City
Banks established in 1946
1946 establishments in Oklahoma
Companies that filed for Chapter 11 bankruptcy in 2022